The 1947 Balkan Cup, officially called the Balkan and Central European Championship, was played between May and October 1947 between Albania, Romania, Bulgaria, Yugoslavia and Hungary. It was Hungary's first participation in the tournament (hence the name change), in which it won all the matches.

Final standings

Matches

Winner

Statistics

Goalscorers

References 

1947
1946–47 in European football
1947–48 in European football
1946–47 in Romanian football
1947–48 in Romanian football
1946–47 in Bulgarian football
1947–48 in Bulgarian football
1946–47 in Yugoslav football
1947–48 in Yugoslav football
1946–47 in Hungarian football
1947–48 in Hungarian football
1947 in Albanian football